Lin Ye (born 1 February 1996) is a Chinese-born Singaporean table tennis player. Born in China, Lin started playing table tennis at the age of 8. She later moved to Singapore where she obtained citizenship in 2013 via the Foreign Sports Talent Scheme. Lin was named the Young Player of the Year in 2013 and 2014.

Lin won a team gold and singles bronze medal at the 2014 Commonwealth Games.

On 2 June 2015, Lin and her compatriot, Zhou Yihan, defeated top seed Feng Tianwei and Yu Mengyu 4–3 to clinch the Women Doubles title in 28th Southeast Asian Games held in Singapore. The pair continued their good momentum and caused one of the biggest upset in history when they defeated the top doubles pair Ding Ning and Liu Shiwen 3–0 in ITTF World Tour, Japan Open Semi-Final but lost to another China pair of Wu Yang and Liu Fei in the Final.

On 12 December 2015, Lin defeated Hamamoto Yui of Japan to clinch the U21 singles title in ITTF World Tour Grand Finals held in Lisbon, Portugal. This is her second U21 singles title.

References

External links
 

1996 births
Living people
Table tennis players from Hunan
People from Zhangjiajie
Chinese emigrants to Singapore
Singaporean sportspeople of Chinese descent
Naturalised citizens of Singapore
Naturalised table tennis players
Chinese female table tennis players
Singaporean female table tennis players
Commonwealth Games gold medallists for Singapore
Table tennis players at the 2014 Asian Games
Table tennis players at the 2018 Asian Games
Table tennis players at the 2014 Commonwealth Games
Commonwealth Games bronze medallists for Singapore
Asian Games medalists in table tennis
Asian Games bronze medalists for Singapore
Commonwealth Games medallists in table tennis
Medalists at the 2014 Asian Games
Table tennis players at the 2018 Commonwealth Games
Southeast Asian Games medalists in table tennis
Southeast Asian Games gold medalists for Singapore
Competitors at the 2013 Southeast Asian Games
Competitors at the 2015 Southeast Asian Games
Competitors at the 2019 Southeast Asian Games
Table tennis players at the 2020 Summer Olympics
Olympic table tennis players of Singapore
Medallists at the 2014 Commonwealth Games
Medallists at the 2018 Commonwealth Games